Harshita Tomar is an Indian sailor. She won the bronze medal at 2018 Asian Games in women's Open Laser 4.7. She received a prize money of 50 lakhs from M.P. government.

References

Indian female sailors (sport)
Living people
Asian Games medalists in sailing
Sailors at the 2018 Asian Games
2002 births
Asian Games bronze medalists for India
Medalists at the 2018 Asian Games